The following is a list of named islands of the state of Wisconsin.  According to the USGS, there are 431 named islands, and many more unnamed ones among Wisconsin's 15,074 lakes.  Wisconsin borders both Lake Michigan and Lake Superior producing many of the state's islands. The Mississippi River also has many islands on the state's western boundary. Wisconsin has many rivers including the Wisconsin River and Fox River.

Great Lakes

Lake Michigan
Many of the Wisconsin's islands in Lake Michigan are around the Door Peninsula. Islands in Green Bay include those in and around the Green Bay Breakwater. Washington Island is Wisconsin's largest in Lake Michigan and also has a year-round population of 708 as of the 2010 census. The island has a ferry service and operates Washington Island Airport for air travel. Rock Island is a state park that can only be accessed by ferry from Washington Island. Plum Island is home to a former Coast Guard Life-Saving Station and historic range lights. The islands surrounding the northern part of the peninsula are outcroppings of the Niagara Escarpment.

Texas Rock is officially classified as an island, but is only above the surface of the water with very low water levels.

Lake Superior
Wisconsin's northernmost point is on Devils Island, part of the Apostle Islands in Lake Superior. It has a population of 302 as of the 2010 census. It can be reached by ferry and airplanes at Major Gilbert Field Airport. The Islands are part of the Apostle Islands National Lakeshore and are featured in Wisconsin's America the Beautiful quarter.

Inland Lake and River Islands
There are 377 named islands in inland lakes, rivers and marshes, and many more unnamed islands.  Over half of the named islands are in the Mississippi River, Wisconsin River, Beaver Dam Lake or Horicon Marsh.

See also
Geography of Wisconsin
Great Lakes
Islands of the Midwest

References

Islands of Wisconsin
Wisconsin
Islands